The Schafmatt (1,979 m) is a mountain of the Emmental Alps, located north of Flühli in the canton of Lucerne. It lies north of the Fürstein, where the border with the canton of Obwalden runs.

References

External links
 Schafmatt on Hikr

Mountains of Switzerland
Mountains of the Alps
Mountains of the canton of Lucerne
Emmental Alps